James Aubusson (born 14 December 1986 in Sydney, New South Wales) is an Australian former professional rugby league footballer who played in 2000s and 2010s. He played for the Sydney Roosters and the Melbourne Storm in the Australian National Rugby League (NRL) competition.

Early life
Aubusson was educated at St John's College, Woodlawn, where he represented 2003 Australian Schoolboys.

Playing career
He made his NRL debut in round 1 of the 2007 NRL season for Melbourne Storm against the Wests Tigers.  

Aubusson signed a three-year contract with the Sydney Roosters until the end of the 2010 NRL season, a move that re-united him with his younger brother, Mitchell.

In the 2008 NRL season, Aubusson made 23 appearances as the Sydney Roosters qualified for the finals.  Aubusson played in the club's semi-final loss against the New Zealand Warriors.  The following year, Aubusson was limited to nine games as the Sydney Roosters finished last on the table which had not happened to the club since 1966.  In the 2010 NRL season, the club had a complete form reversal and reached the 2010 NRL Grand Final.  Aubusson played in the club's victory over the Gold Coast in the preliminary final but missed out on selection for the decider.

Coaching career
In November 2010, Aubusson announced he would coach the Goulburn Workers Bulldogs for three seasons beginning in 2011 after being released by the Sydney Roosters.

Career highlights
 Junior Representative: 2003, Australian Schoolboys; 2005, New South Wales U19 and Junior Kangaroo selection
 First Grade Debut: Melbourne Storm v Wests Tigers, 16 March 2007 (Round 1) at Olympic Park.

References

External links
Sydney Roosters profile

1986 births
Living people
Melbourne Storm players
Sydney Roosters players
Newtown Jets NSW Cup players
Norths Devils players
Rugby league hookers
Rugby league players from Sydney